Micrurapteryx sophorella is a moth of the family Gracillariidae. It is known from Azerbaijan, Kazakhstan, the Caucasus and Uzbekistan.

The larvae feed on Sophora species. They probably mine the leaves of their host plant.

References

Gracillariinae
Moths described in 1979
Moths of Asia
Insects of Central Asia